HMS Stronghold was an  destroyer, which served with the Royal Navy during the Second World War. The ship was one of the first vehicles to deploy an unmanned aircraft. Launched on 6 May 1919, the destroyer was fitted with a simple catapult in 1924, which used a bag of sand as a weight, and launched the RAE 1921 Target, an early form of unmanned aircraft. A more sophisticated cordite catapult was fitted in 1927 and used to launch the more advanced RAE Larynx. In total, more than twenty test flights were undertaken before the catapult was removed. The destroyer was subsequently fitted out as a minelayer. At the start of the Second World War, the destroyer was based in Singapore. Stronghold helped to rescue the Supermarine Walrus from the battlecruiser , which had been sunk by the Japanese, in 1941 and, the following year, towed the destroyer  on the first part of the Royal Australian Navy vessel's journey to Fremantle. Heavily outgunned, the destroyer was sunk with the loss of nine officers and sixty-one ratings.

Design and development

Stronghold was one of thirty-three Admiralty  destroyers ordered by the British Admiralty in June 1917 as part of the Twelfth War Construction Programme. Differences with the R class were minor, such as having the searchlight moved aft.

Two funnels were fitted. The ship had a complement of 90 officers and ratings.

Armament consisted of three QF  Mk IV guns on the ship's centreline.  One was mounted raised on the forecastle, one between the funnels and one aft. The ship also mounted a single  2-pounder pom-pom anti-aircraft gun for air defence. Four  tubes were fitted in two twin rotating mounts aft. The ship was designed to mount two  tubes either side of the superstructure but this addition required the forecastle plating to be cut away, making the vessel very wet, so they were not fitted. The weight saved enabled the heavier Mark V 21-inch torpedo to be carried.

Construction and career

Interwar service
Laid down in March 1918 by Scotts Shipbuilding and Engineering Company in Greenock with the yard number 494, Stronghold was launched on 6 May 1919. The vessel was the first, and only, of the name. Completed on 2 July 1919, the ship served in active duty for only a few days, being reduced to the Reserve Fleet at Portsmouth on 10 July. The vessel was recommissioned in Reserve at Portsmouth on 16 August 1920.

Unlike many of the class which suffered deterioration over the ensuing years, Stronghold was drafted into service as part of Naval experiments with the Royal Navy's first experiments with guided missiles. In 1924, the destroyer was equipped with a simple catapult to launch the RAE 1921 Target unmanned vehicle. First used on 3 September, 1924, despite the flight lasting only twelve minutes, this was the first Remote Piloted Vehicle (RPV) flown. The Target was successfully launched twelve times in the following two years. The aircraft was initially accelerated to launch by the simple process of dropping a large bag of water off the side of the ship. This was replaced by a more sophisticated catapult powered by cordite in 1927. The new catapult was used to test the more capable RAE Larynx, the first success launch taking place in the Bristol Channel on 20 July 1927. At the second launch, on 1 September, the aircraft is believed to have flown , while the third and final flight, on 15 October, struck the ground  from its target after travelling . The catapult was subsequently removed. In July 1931, Stronghold, in reserve at Portsmouth was recommissioned to replace  as tender to the Torpedo School, with Taras crew transferring to Stronghold. In 1938, Stronghold was equipped as a minelayer, capable of carrying thirty-eight mines as an alternative to the aft guns and torpedo tubes.

Second World War
At the start of the Second World War, Stronghold was based in Singapore. On 10 December 1941, the destroyer was once again involved in supporting aircraft, this time a Supermarine Walrus from the battlecruiser . The flying boat had been launched prior to the Japanese aerial attack that had sunk the capital ship and had been flying since. Stronghold took the aircraft in tow back to Singapore, the ASV radar mounted in the Walrus proving a useful security against submarine attack. The force was allocated to escorting convoys. On 3 February, Stronghold was tasked with towing the Royal Australian Navy destroyer , which had been refitting in Singapore, on the first part of that vessel's journey to Fremantle.

Between 11 and 13 February, the destroyer helped escorting what has been termed the Empire Star Convoy, after the Blue Star Line refrigerated cargo ship Empire Star. Stronghold was then assigned to undertake an anti-submarine patrol off the coast of Cilacap. The destroyer spotted the Dutch evacuee ship Zandaam and provided essential cover against submarines until the heavily laiden vessel steamed off at speed to Fremantle. The destroyer then set off itself for Onslow, Western Australia.

The seaplane reported the position of the British vessel to the Japanese fleet. As 17:05, the first shell splashes appeared to the starboard. Stronghold returning fire soon after. Heavily outgunned, the destroyer sustained damage aft, in the forward mess and the engine room, which had to be abandoned. The Japanese destroyers then attacked with torpedoes, one of which crippled the ship. The crew abandoned ship and Stronghold sank at 19:00. The cruiser expended 635 rounds, Nowaki 345 rounds and Arashi 290 rounds in the sinking.

The crew had to rely on Carley floats as the ship's lifeboats had been destroyed in the action The four floats separated and drifted in the open sea for three days. Fifty survivors were rescued by a Dutch steamer with a Japanese crew on 5 March, who were then transferred to a Japanese cruiser and interred as prisoners of war. In all, nine officers and sixty-one ratings were killed, with an additional two subsequently dying in the camp.

Pennant numbers

References

Citations

Bibliography

 

 
 
 
 
 
 
 
 
 
 
 
 
 
 

1919 ships
Ships built on the River Clyde
S-class destroyers (1917) of the Royal Navy
World War II destroyers of the United Kingdom
World War II shipwrecks in the Java Sea